Pleurobema is a genus of freshwater mussels, aquatic bivalve mollusks in the family Unionidae, the river mussels.

Species
Species within the genus Pleurobema include:

 Pleurobema altum (Highnut)
 Pleurobema avellanum (Hazel pigtoe)
 Pleurobema beadleianum (Mississippi pigtoe)
 Pleurobema bournianum (Scioto pigtoe)
 Pleurobema chattanoogaense (Painted clubshell)
 Pleurobema clava (Club naiad)
 Pleurobema collina (James River spinymussel)
 Pleurobema cordatum (Ohio pigtoe)
 Pleurobema curtum (Black clubshell)
 Pleurobema decisum (Southern clubshell)
 Pleurobema flavidulum (Yellow pigtoe)
 Pleurobema furvum (Dark pigtoe)
 Pleurobema georgianum (Southern pigtoe)
 Pleurobema gibberum (Cumberland pigtoe)
 Pleurobema hagleri (Brown pigtoe)
 Pleurobema hanleyianum (Georgia pigtoe)
 Pleurobema hartmanianum (Cherokee pigtoe)
 Pleurobema johannis (Alabama pigtoe)
 Pleurobema marshalli (Flat pigtoe)
 Pleurobema nucleopsis (Longnut)
 Pleurobema oviforme (Tennessee clubshell)
 Pleurobema perovatum (Ovate clubshell)
 Pleurobema plenum (Rough pigtoe pearly mussel)
 Pleurobema pyriforme (Oval pigtoe)
 Pleurobema riddellii (Louisiana pigtoe)
 Pleurobema rubrum (Pyramid pigtoe)
 Pleurobema sintoxia (Round pigtoe)
 Pleurobema stabile (Coosa pigtoe)
 Pleurobema strodeanum (Fuzzy pigtoe)
 Pleurobema taitianum (Heavy pigtoe)
 Pleurobema troschelianum (Alabama clubshell)
 Pleurobema verum (True pigtoe)

References

 
Bivalve genera
Taxonomy articles created by Polbot